The Algiers Agreement was a peace agreement between the governments of Eritrea and Ethiopia that was signed on 12 December 2000, at Algiers, Algeria, to formally end the Eritrean–Ethiopian War, a border war fought by the two countries from 1998 to 2000. In the agreement, the two parties reaffirmed the Agreement on Cessation of Hostilities, which had been signed on 18 June 2000.

The Algiers Agreement provided for the exchange of prisoners and the return of displaced persons and established a Boundary Commission to demarcate the border and a Claims Commission to assess damages caused by the conflict.

Conditions and structure of the agreement
The purpose of the agreement was to:

 End/terminate hostilities permanently and agree to refrain from the threat or use of force.
 Respect and implement fully the provisions of an agreement on cessation of hostilities signed on 18 June 2000.
 Release and repatriate all prisoners of war and all other persons detained.
 Provide humane treatment to each other's nationals and persons of each other's national origin within their respective territories.

The agreement established three commissions: the Eritrea–Ethiopia Boundary Commission (to delimit and demarcate the border between the two states), the Eritrea–Ethiopia Claims Commission (to assess claims for damages stemming from the war), and an independent and impartial body appointed by the UN Secretary General to investigate the beginnings of the war.

Each commission was composed of five members and located in The Hague, Netherlands. Each country was to appoint two commissioners who were not nationals of the country. The president of each commission was selected by the other commissioners. Provision was made that if they failed to agree on a president within 30 days, the Secretary-General of the United Nations would appoint a president after consultation with the parties. The Boundaries Commission and the Claims Commission would work with the Permanent Court of Arbitration to judge each party’s claims.

In July 2001, the Commission sat to decide its jurisdiction, procedures and possible remedies. The result of this sitting was issued in August 2001. In October 2001, following consultations with the Parties, the Commission adopted its Rules of Procedure. In December 2001, the Parties filed their claims with the commission. The claims filed by the Parties relate to such matters as the conduct of military operations in the front zones, the treatment of POWs and of civilians and their property, diplomatic immunities and the economic impact of certain government actions during the conflict.

Final ruling 
On 13 April 2002, the Eritrea–Ethiopia Boundary Commission, in collaboration with Permanent Court of Arbitration in The Hague, agreed upon a "final and binding" verdict. The ruling awarded some territory to each side, but Badme (the flash point of the conflict) was awarded to Eritrea. At the same time, on 21 December 2005, another commission at the Permanent Court of Arbitration ruled that Eritrea broke international law when it attacked Ethiopia in 1998, triggering the broader conflict. At the end of 2005, final awards had been issued on claims on Pensions, and Ports. Partial awards have been issued for claims about: Prisoners of War, the Central Front, Civilians Claims, the Western and Eastern Fronts, Diplomatic, Economic and property losses, and Jus ad bellum.

The Ethiopia–Eritrean Claims Commission ruled that:

Reactions and later developments 

Both countries initially vowed to accept the decision wholeheartedly the day after the ruling was made official. A few months later, however, Ethiopia requested clarifications, then stated it was deeply dissatisfied with the ruling. In September 2003, Eritrea refused to agree to a new commission, which they would have had to agree to if the old binding agreement was to be set aside, and asked the international community to put pressure on Ethiopia to accept the ruling. In November 2004, Ethiopia accepted the ruling "in principle".

Still, the border question remained in dispute. In September 2007, Ethiopia alleged that Eritrea was violating the agreement, and warned that it could use this as grounds to terminate or suspend the agreement. In November 2007, the EEBC concluded the demarcation phase of the Algiers Agreement; by the end of 2007, however, an estimated 4000 Eritrean troops remained in the 'demilitarized zone' with a further 120,000 along its side of the border. Ethiopia maintained 100,000 troops along its side, and low-scale conflict had continued in the meantime.

Overall, while the treaty succeeded in stopping the full-scale war, it failed to fully resolve the border dispute, as the fighting over this would continue until 2018.

Christine Gray, in an article in the European Journal of International Law (2006), questioned the jurisdiction of the Claims Commission to decide whether Eritrea had violated international law, saying that "there were many factors which suggested that the Commission should have abstained from giving judgment," and that making this ruling through an arbitration court was inappropriate. Additionally, she stated that the hearing for this claim – according to the Algiers Agreement – was to be heard by a separate commission, and to be an investigation of exclusively factual concern, not compensation.

2018 Peace Agreement 

The Ethiopian government under the leadership of new prime minister Abiy Ahmed unexpectedly announced on 5 June 2018 that it fully accepted the terms of the Algiers Agreement. Ethiopia also announced that it would accept the outcome of the 2002 UN-backed Eritrea-Ethiopia Boundary Commission (EEBC) ruling which awarded disputed territories including the town of Badme to Eritrea.

See also 

 2018 Eritrea–Ethiopia summit
 Ethiopia–Tigray peace agreement

References

External links

Full text of Algiers Agreement, UN Peacemaker
All Peace Agreements for Eritrea, UN Peacemaker
All Peace Agreements for Ethiopia, UN Peacemaker

2000 in Ethiopia
2000 in Eritrea
Eritrean–Ethiopian border conflict
Eritrea–Ethiopia relations
History of Algiers
Peace treaties of Ethiopia
Peace treaties of Eritrea
Treaties concluded in 2000
Eritrea–Ethiopia border